Grevillea inconspicua, commonly known as Cue grevillea, is a species of flowering plant in the family Proteaceae and is endemic to the central-west of Western Australia. It is a prickly, densely-branched shrub with linear leaves and clusters of off-white to silvery grey flowers.

Description

Taxonomy
Grevillea inconspicua was first formally described in 1904 by Ludwig Diels in Ernst Georg Pritzel's Botanische Jahrbücher für Systematik, Pflanzengeschichte und Pflanzengeographie. The specific epithet (inconspicua) means "undistinguished", referring to the flowers.

Distribution and habitat
Cue grevillea occurs in the central-west area of Western Australia near Cue, Meekatharra the Weld Range and Sandstone, where it grows in shrub communities often along drainage lines and gullies.

Conservation status
Grevillea inconspicua is listed as "Priority Four" by the Government of Western Australia Department of Biodiversity, Conservation and Attractions, meaning that it is rare or near threatened.

Use in horticulture
The shrub is suitable for use in a water wise garden, although it is not showy, it can take full sun and well drained soils are recommended.

See also
 List of Grevillea species

References

inconspicua
Proteales of Australia
Eudicots of Western Australia
Taxa named by Ludwig Diels
Plants described in 1904